Bloody Hell is a 2020 Australian horror comedy film directed by Alister Grierson and written by Robert Benjamin (in his screenwriting debut). It tells the story of a man with a mysterious past who flees from his homeland to escape his own personal hell - to unknowingly experience something even more sinister and hellish. The film stars Ben O'Toole, Caroline Craig and Matthew Sunderland.

The film premiered in Australia on October 8, 2020, and in the United States a day later at the Nightstream Film Festival.

Plot 
Rex Coen (Ben O'Toole), an American veteran, visits a bank to see a teller  who he has a crush on. While the two are flirting, a group of armed robbers storm the bank; With the help of his subconscious, which he sees as an external entity, Rex kills the group of robbers and saves everyone except one  bystander who is accidentally shot.

As a result of the blood bath robbery,  Rex is sent to trial where he takes a plea deal and serves 8 years in prison. After harassment from the media, Rex decides to vacation to Finland and upon arriving is kidnapped. He awakens with one of his legs amputated and his hands bound to the ceiling. He works with his subconscious entity to discern that Rex is being held captive by a family of cannibals.

In a struggle Rex takes Olaf, a child in the family, hostage and negotiates a failed escape with Olaf's sister Alia. As the parents take Olaf to the hospital to treat his wounds in the hostage scuffle, Alia confesses she likes Rex while nursing him and tells about her family.

Alia explains that her cannibalistic family, particularly her eldest brother Pati,  kidnap American tourists to eat and that Rex is the latest victim. Alia is an outcast due to her non-violent tendencies and has been forced to be Pati's feeder. Alia gives Rex a knife for defense. When the family comes back, Rex kills the uncle with the knife and escapes the room and kills the mother, father and a brother with Alia. The commotion draws Pati out, who is revealed to be a grotesque giant. Rex kills him with the sharp bone of his amputated leg.

Rex is praised by his subconscious entity, who realizes he is no longer needed and disappears. Alia and Rex return to America as a couple with Olaf. At a Welcome Home party, Alia suddenly imagines killing a guest with a meat cleaver and Olaf looks at a photo of his former family and muses aloud that it may be time for an "American banquet". Olaf is present in the photo alongside Pati and the third brother, showing he is actually part of   a set of triplets, not twins, and that  Olaf only appears to be much a child.

Cast
 Ben O'Toole as Rex Coen
 Caroline Craig as Mother
 Matthew Sunderland as Father
 Travis Jeffery as Gael / Gideon
 Jack Finsterer as Uncle
 Meg Fraser as Alia
 David Hill as Olli
 Joshua Brennan as Pete
 Ashlee Lollback as Maddy
 Sophia Emberson-Bain as Olivia
 Russ Gallagher as Robert Bell

Release
Bloody Hell was selected at the 25th Bucheon International Fantastic Film Festival (BIFAN) in South Korea, held in July 2021. It was showcased in the World Fantastic Red section of the festival.

Reception 
On Rotten Tomatoes the film has an approval rating of 91% based on reviews from 56 critics. The site's critic consensus reads, "For genre fans in the mood to watch some darkly funny mayhem, Bloody Hell lives up to its title in all the best ways."

Accolades
Brad Shield was nominated on his work for best cinematography at the 10th AACTA Awards. At the 2021 APRA-AGSC Screen Music Awards, composer Brian Cachia won Best Film Score of the Year. It was also nominated for a Golden Trailer award for best motion poster.

References

External links
 
 

American action horror films
Australian action horror films
Films about cannibalism
Films shot in Finland
2020s English-language films
2020s action horror films
2020s American films
Films set in basement
Films set in Idaho